The Roberts Ranch (also known as the Old Allen Place or Baucom Place) is a historic site in Immokalee, Florida. It is located at 1215 Roberts Avenue. On October 4, 2003, it was added to the U.S. National Register of Historic Places.

Immokalee Pioneer Museum
The Immokalee Pioneer Museum, located at Roberts Ranch, is a  open-air museum that includes 19 preserved buildings of the original ranch.  The Ranch is operated as one of the 5 Collier County Museums. Displays focus on late 19th century ranch life at the edge of the Big Cypress Swamp.

References

External links
 Collier County listings at National Register of Historic Places
 Immokalee Pioneer Museum at Roberts Ranch at Florida's Office of Cultural and Historical Programs

External links 
 Immokalee Pioneer Museum at Roberts Ranch - Collier County Museums
 Immokalee Pioneer Museum - information from Collier County
 Immokalee Pioneer Museum - Information and map from Explore Naples

Museums in Collier County, Florida
National Register of Historic Places in Collier County, Florida
Rural history museums in Florida
Open-air museums in Florida